The Battle of Sukho Island, also known as Operation Brazil, was an amphibious operation and naval engagement on Lake Ladoga between the Soviet Navy and a German Luftwaffe naval detachment during World War II.

Background 
During the Siege of Leningrad the Soviets moved supplies to the city through Lake Ladoga. The Axis deployed the Finnish Ladoga Naval Detachment, Naval Detachment K (including the Italian XII Squadriglia MAS), and the German Luftwaffe Einsatzstab Fähre Ost, to interdict the route; MAS conducted torpedo boat attacks. The combined Axis force failed to significantly interrupt traffic.

The culmination of Axis operations was the raid against Sukho Island, 20 km from the southern shore of the lake, which covered supply lines and the approaches to Soviet bases.

Axis forces
The attack was commanded by Oberstleutnant Wachtel. The flotilla was composed of 16 Siebel ferries, 7 infantry boats, and the Italian motor torpedo boat MAS-526. Seven ferries (SF-11, SF-13, SF-15, SF-17, SF-21, SF-23, SF-25) were fitted with heavy weapons. Four ferries (SF-12, SF-14, SF-22, SF-26) were fitted with light weapons. A 70-man landing party was carried aboard three transport ferries (T-2, T-4, T-6), and allocated five of the infantry boats. There was also one headquarters and one hospital ferry.

Battle 
The German ferries were escorted at a distance by MAS-526; critically, surprise was lost when they were detected by Soviet minesweeper TSch-100, which joined the battle later. The Axis landing party landed on Sukho under the cover of the armed ferries; two of the three Soviet 100mm guns were destroyed, and the lighthouse was damaged but not taken. The landing party withdrew after sustaining casualties and losing radio contact.

On the lake, multiple German ferries grounded around the island. SF-12 grounded on rocks, followed by SF-13 while attempting to assist. SF-22 grounded after being disabled by the remaining Soviet 100mm gun; SF-14 and SF-26 grounded attempting to assist. A Soviet patrol boat was damaged and retreated under a smoke screen. The arrival of Soviet gunboats and MO patrol boats forced the Axis to withdraw after having refloated SF-14 and SF-22.

Soviet naval and air forces pursued but inflicted only minor damage on the retreating Germans; attacks by the Soviet motor torpedo boats TK-61 and TK-71 scored no hits, while the Germans claimed four hits on a Soviet ship. The German retreat was slowed by ferries suffering machinery failure. SF-21 was used as a rearguard; it silenced the remaining gun on Sukho but was then abandoned and scuttled - along with infantry boat I-6 - when it began to sink from leaks and pump failures.

Aftermath 
The Axis suffered heavy casualties for little result, and marked the effective end of offensive Axis operations on Lake Ladoga. 17 of the 23 participating German ships were sunk or seriously damaged.; four armed ferries  (SF-13, SF-21, SF-12, SF-26) and one infantry boat (I-6) were lost, and SF-22 was heavily damaged. Crew and troop casualties amounted to 18 killed, 57 wounded and 4 missing.

Total Soviet losses are 9 KIA, 15 WIA. Beyond naval losses, the Germans took six prisoners from Sukho.

See also
Road of Life

References

1942 in Finland
Sukho Island
Sukho Island
Sukho Island